Outhier is a French surname. Notable people with the surname include:

 Louis Outhier, French chef
 Réginald Outhier (1694–1774), French priest and geodesist

French-language surnames